Dhulghat Spiral is located in Amravati district in state of Maharashtra in India. It is a unique spiral located on Akola-Khandwa metre gauge section of South Central Railway of India.

It is also called 'Char Cha Akda' in Marathi and 'Char Ka Aankda' in Hindi, both meaning 'Digit of Four' due to its shape similar to that of '4' in Devnagari script.

Location
The spiral is located between Wan Road and Dhulghat stations on Akola - Ratlam metre gauge railway line, at around 2 kilometres from Dhulghat station towards Akola. The area is covered by forests and hills through which the Akola - Ratlam metre gauge railway line traverses. Latitude 21.282, longitude 76.765.

Structure
The spiral consist of a 193 metres long steel viaduct across a shallow valley. Train arrives to this viaduct from Akola. The viaduct leads the track to a circular path around a hill. After circumnavigating the hill, the track arrives nearly parallel to the approach from Akola, but at a significantly lower altitude. This low level track passes below the first of the sixteen bridge girders towards Dhulghat station and Khandwa. The train normally takes around four minutes to complete its journey along the spiral.

Historical and current usage
The spiral was a part of metre gauge line from Ajmer in Rajasthan to Kacheguda in Andhra Pradesh (now Telangana) under South Central Railway. Due to the gauge conversions in recent times, the route is now shortened to Akola in Maharashtra to Fatehbad Chandrawati Ganj in Madhya Pradesh. However, this unique spiral may soon be decommissioned because of the planned gauge conversion of Akola-Ratlam section.

How to reach
The spiral can be approached from Akola which is a railway station on Mumbai-Howrah main line and Khandwa which is located on Mumbai - Delhi main line (via Bhusaval, Itarsi) of Indian Railway.

References

Amravati district
Environment of Maharashtra
Geography of Maharashtra